is the remains of a castle structure in Nara, Nara Prefecture.

Yagyū castle was constructed by the Yagyū clan in the Nanboku-chō period and became a home castle of the Yagyū clan. In 1544, the castle was attacked by Tsutsui Junkei's force and defeated. Later, Yagyū clan was approved as the main domain of Yagyū in Yamato by Oda Nobunaga. In 1590, Toyotomi Hideyoshi seized the territories of the Yagyū clan.

In the Battle of Sekigahara, Yagyū clan joined the West squad and after the battle Yagyū clan was given their old territory by Tokugawa Ieyasu. In 1643, Yagyū Munenori built clan's new residence called Yagyū Jinya near the castle.

Hotoku-ji Temple and Masaki school of swordplay are on site.

References

Castles in Nara Prefecture
Historic Sites of Japan
Former castles in Japan
Ruined castles in Japan
Yagyū clan